= Bogur =

Coordinates: 15°34′N 74°52′E

- Village
- Interactive map of Bogur
- Country: India
- State: Karnataka
- District: Dharwad
- Talukas: Dharwad

Population (2011)
  - Total: 1,099

Languages
  - Official: Kannada
- Time zone: UTC+5:30 (IST)

Bogur is a village in Dharwad district in the southern state of Karnataka, India.

== Demographics ==
As of the 2011 Census of India there were 225 households in Bogur and a total population of 1,099 consisting of 573 males and 526 females. There were 160 children aged 0–6.
